The 317th Infantry Regiment was a regiment of the United States Army during World War II. It was one of three infantry regiments in the 80th Infantry Division. Today, it is known as the 317th Regiment and is based in Lynchburg, Virginia as a training unit within the United States Army Reserve - currently under the 104th Training Division.

History
The regiment was first commanded by Colonel A. Donald Cameron. In October, 1944, he was replaced by Colonel Warfield M. Lewis. The final commander of the regiment, appointed in December, 1944, was Lieutenant Colonel  Henry G. Fisher, who served in this capacity until the end of the war. The unit was inactivated on 10 January 1946 at Camp Kilmer in New Jersey.

After World War II, the parent 80th Division was reactivated as airborne, and the 317th was redesignated on 15 July 1946 as the 317th Parachute Infantry, an element of the 80th Airborne Division. It was redesignated again only months later on 23 September 1946 as the 317th Glider Infantry and then activated on 14 November 1946 in the Organized Reserves with headquarters at Washington, D.C. On 5 October 1950 it was reorganized and redesignated as the 317th Airborne Infantry, but this was not to last. Maintaining airborne status in Reserve units proved to be extremely difficult, and on 10 May 1952 the unit was reorganized and redesignated as the 317th Infantry.

Switching from a focus on combat to a training role, the unit was reorganized and redesignated on 6 March 1959 as the 317th Regiment, an element of the 80th Division (Training), with headquarters at Washington, D.C.  (The location of the headquarters changed on 1 December 1960 to Riverdale, Maryland.)  On 31 January 1968 the 317th was reorganized to consist of the 1st, 2d, and 3d Battalions, elements of the 80th Division (Training).  It was reorganized several more times to remain within a training focus:

in 1994 it was assigned to the 80th Division (Institutional Training);
in 2007 it was assigned to the 95th Division (Institutional Training);
in 2008 it was assigned to the 98th Division (Institutional Training).

The most current reorganization was in 2016 to the 104th Training Division (Leader Training). The regiment currently consists of a single battalion – 2nd Battalion, 317th Regiment, which is a drill sergeant battalion headquartered in Lynchburg, Virginia. The battalion has a mission of conducting Cadet Summer Training (CST) for Reserve Officer's Training Corps (ROTC) basic (first-year) cadets at Fort Knox, Kentucky. The battalion has six drill sergeant companies, located in Charlottesville, Virginia (A Co), Salem, Virginia (B Co), Charleston, West Virginia (C Co), Lynchburg, Virginia (D Co), Culpeper, Virginia (E Co), and Dublin, Virginia (F Co).

Lineage
 Constituted 5 August 1917 in the National Army (USA) as the 317th Infantry and assigned to the 80th Division
 Organized 23–27 August 1917 at Camp Lee, Virginia
 Demobilized 13–14 June at Camp Lee, Virginia
 Reconstituted 24 June 1921 in the Organized Reserves as the 317th Infantry and assigned to the 80th Division (later redesignated as the 80th Infantry Division)
 Organized in November 1921 with headquarters at Lynchburg, Virginia
 Ordered into active military service 15 July 1942 and reorganized at Camp Forrest, Tennessee
 Inactivated 10 January 1946 at Camp Kilmer, New Jersey
 Redesignated 15 July 1946 as the 317th Parachute Infantry, an element of the 80th Airborne Division
 Redesignated 23 September 1946 as the 317th Glider Infantry
 Activated 14 November 1946 in the Organized Reserves with headquarters at Washington, D.C.
 (Organized Reserves redesignated 25 March 1948 as the Organized Reserve Corps; redesignated 9 July 1952 as the Army Reserve)
 Reorganized and redesignated 5 October 1950 as the 317th Airborne Infantry
 Reorganized and redesignated 10 May 1952 as the 317th Infantry, an element of the 80th Infantry Division
 Reorganized and redesignated 6 March 1959 as the 317th Regiment, an element of the 80th Division (Training), with headquarters at Washington, D.C.
 (Location of headquarters changed 1 December 1960 to Riverdale, Maryland)
 Reorganized 31 January 1968 to consist of the 1st, 2nd, and 3rd Battalions, elements of the 80th Division (Training)
 Reorganized 1 October 1994 to consist of the 1st, 2nd, and 3rd Battalions, elements of the 80th Division (Institutional Training)
 Reorganized 1 October 2007 to consist of the 1st and 2nd Battalions, elements of the 95th Division (Institutional Training)
 Reorganized 1 October 2008 to consist of the 1st and 2nd Battalions, elements of the 98th Division (Institutional Training)
 Reorganized 1 October 2016 to consist of the 2nd Battalion, element of the 104th Division (Leader Training)

Distinctive unit insignia
 Description
A Gold color metal and enamel device 1 5/32 inches (2.94 cm) in height consisting of a shield blazoned:  Azure, on a bend Or three alerions of the field, in base a lion rampant of the second.  Attached below and to the sides of the shield a tripartite Gold scroll inscribed "ARMIS" to dexter, "ET" in base and "ANIMIS" to sinister, all in Blue letters.
 Symbolism
The shield is blue for Infantry.  The bend and alerions are taken from the coat of arms of Lorraine, but the tinctures are changed, and the lion represents service in the Picardy Sector.  The motto translates to "By Arms and By Courage."
 Background
The distinctive unit insignia was originally approved for the 317th Infantry Regiment, Organized Reserves on 26 February 1927.  It was redesignated for the 317th Airborne Infantry Regiment, Organized Reserve Corps on 23 April 1952.  It was redesignated for the 317th Infantry Regiment, Organized Reserve Corps on 21 August 1952.  The insignia was redesignated for the 317th Regiment, Army Reserve on 8 August 1960.

Coat of arms
Blazon
 Shield- Azure, on a bend Or three alerions of the field, in base a lion rampant of the second.
 Crest- That for the regiments and separate battalions of the Army Reserve:  On a wreath of the colors Or and Azure the Lexington Minute Man Proper.  The statue of the Minute Man, Captain John Parker (H.H. Kitson, sculptor), stands on the Common in Lexington, Massachusetts.
 Motto ARMIS ET ANIMIS (By Arms and By Courage).

Symbolism
 Shield- The shield is blue for Infantry.  The bend and alerions are taken from the coat of arms of Lorraine, but the tinctures are changed, and the lion represents service in the Picardy Sector.
 Crest- The crest is that of the United States Army Reserve.

Background- The coat of arms was originally approved for the 317th Infantry Regiment, Organized Reserves on 28 February 1927.  It was redesignated for the 317th Airborne Infantry Regiment, Organized Reserve Corps on 23 April 1952.  It was redesignated for the 317th Infantry Regiment, Organized Reserve Corps on 21 August 1952.  The insignia was redesignated for the 317th Regiment, Army Reserve on 8 August 1960.

References

External links
 https://www.facebook.com/2nd-Battalion-317th-Regiment-Second-to-None-138576716267375/
 https://www.facebook.com/blueridgeassociation/
 https://www.facebook.com/pages/One-Hell-of-a-War-Pattons-317th-Infantry-Regiment-in-WWII/727262953991395
 http://www.oocities.org/wwii317/317th.pdf
 http://www.80thdivision.com/diary/

317